Arrenoseius is a genus of mites in the Phytoseiidae family.

Species
 Arrenoseius palustris (Chant, 1960)

References

Phytoseiidae